Endotricha medogana is a species of snout moth in the genus Endotricha. It was described by Wang and Li, in 2005, and is known from China (Tibet).

The wingspan is 18–21 mm. The forewings are black suffused with ferrugineous scales. The basal area is black, decorated with silver gray scales. The hindwings are black with mauve scales and the costal margin is silver-gray.

Etymology
This specific name is derived from the type locality, Medog (Motuo) in the Xizang (Tibet) Autonomous Region.

References

Moths described in 2005
Endotrichini